Paul S. McBrayer (October 12, 1909 – January 1, 1999) was an American college men's basketball coach and player. He was a player from 1927 to 1930 at the University of Kentucky and the head coach at Eastern Kentucky University from 1946 to 1962. He coached Eastern Kentucky to a 214–142 record and two NCAA tournament appearances.  As a star player for Kentucky, he was named a 1930 Helms Foundation All-American.  He also served as an assistant coach at Kentucky under Adolph Rupp for nine seasons (1934–43) prior to becoming head coach at Eastern Kentucky.  The McBrayer Arena at Eastern Kentucky University is named in his honor.

Head coaching record

References

1909 births
1999 deaths
All-American college men's basketball players
American men's basketball coaches
Eastern Kentucky Colonels men's basketball coaches
Kentucky Wildcats men's basketball coaches
Kentucky Wildcats men's basketball players
People from Boyd County, Kentucky
American men's basketball players
Basketball coaches from Kentucky
Basketball players from Kentucky